Ranked as the 363,374th most common 
surname in the world.
Approximately 994 people bear this surname. (www.forebears.io)

This uncommon surname is believed to be derived from the Old English term "huit" meaning white. It was used to describe someone with white hair or an unusually pale complexion. The suffix "et" is a shortened form of the French "Petit" meaning small, thus Whittet may describe "a little white" or "son of White". The name also has topographical roots, as it can be traced to the Old English "wiht" meaning "dweller by a bend or curve" in a river or road; hence Whittet would describe "the son of he who dwelt by a river\road bend". On July 1, 1821, one James Whittet was christened at St. Dionis, Backchurch in London. The first recorded spelling of the family name is shown to be that of John Whiteyate, married, which was dated January 18th 1567, St. Dunstan in the East, London, during the reign of Queen Elizabeth I 1558 - 1603.

Notable people with the surname include:

 John Whittet (1925–1989), U.S. Navy officer.
 Lawrence C. Whittet (1871–1954), American politician.
 Brendan Whittet (born 1971), American ice hockey coach.
 Thomas Douglas Whittet, president of the History of Medicine Society.